"Home" is a song performed by Israeli singer Kobi Marimi. It represented Israel in the Eurovision Song Contest 2019, in Tel Aviv. It finished in 23rd place at the final, with 35 points. The song was released on 10 March 2019.

Eurovision Song Contest

The song represented Israel in the Eurovision Song Contest 2019, after Kobi Marimi was selected through HaKokhav HaBa L'Eurovizion, the music competition that selects Israel's entries for the Eurovision Song Contest. As the host country, Israel automatically qualified to compete in the final. In addition to its participation in the final, Israel was also required to broadcast and vote in one of the two semi-finals. At the semi-final draw, it was decided that Israel would have to broadcast and vote in semi-final one.

Track listing

Charts

References

2019 songs
Eurovision songs of 2019
Eurovision songs of Israel